"It Girl" is a song written, produced, and performed by American recording artist Pharrell Williams. The song was released on November 10, 2014 through Columbia Records as the fifth single from his second studio album Girl (2014) in the United Kingdom. The lyrics reference the title in the line you the it girl.

Music video
The official music video for "It Girl" was directed by Mr. and Fantasista Utamaro and was released on September 30, 2014. Produced by Japanese designer Takashi Murakami in his company Kaikai Kiki with Animation Production NAZ, the anime-inspired clip features Williams rendered in the style of various Japanese cartoons and video games.

Charts

Release history

References

2013 songs
2014 singles
Pharrell Williams songs
Animated music videos